"By Your Side" is a song by the English musician James Cottriall, from his second studio album Love Is Louder. It was released in Austria as a digital download on 20 May 2011. It entered the Austrian Singles Chart at number 31, and has peaked to number 24. The song was produced by Doug Petty.

Music video
A music video to accompany the release of "By Your Side" was first released onto YouTube on 8 June 2011 at a total length of three minutes and thirty-two seconds. The video was directed by Nina Saurugg.

Track listing
 Digital download
 "By Your Side" - 3:34
 "By Your Side" (Radio Edit) - 3:25
 "By Your Side" (Live & Acoustic) - 3:23

Credits and personnel
 Lead vocals – James Cottriall
 Producer – Doug Petty
 Lyrics – James Cottriall
 Keyboards – Mark Royce
 Bass – Martin Enzmann
 Drums – Klaus Perez-Salado
 Electric guitar – Severin Trogbacher
 Label: Pate Records

Chart performance

Release history

References

2011 singles
James Cottriall songs
2011 songs